Diospage violitincta is a moth of the subfamily Arctiinae first described by Rothschild in 1909. It is found in South America (the type location is Cauca-Tal).

References

Moths described in 1909
Euchromiina